Gajki  (German: Uhlenhorst) is a village in the administrative district of Gmina Gryfino, within Gryfino County, West Pomeranian Voivodeship, in north-western Poland, close to the German border.

 

The village has a population of 20.

See also
History of Pomerania.

References

Gajki